The Lemoine river (in French: rivière Lemoine) is a tributary of the rivière Pot au Beurre. It generally flows north-west in the municipalities of Saint-Louis (MRC Les Maskoutains) and Sainte-Victoire (MRC Pierre-De Saurel), in the administrative region of Montérégie, on the South Shore of St. Lawrence River, in Quebec, Canada.

The economic vocation of this hydrographic slope is essentially agricultural.

Geography 
The Lemoine River has its source in an agricultural zone at the confluence of the "Décharge des Huit" stream in the municipality of Saint-Louis. This source is located near Chemin du Rang Prescott (north side).

  north-west, up to the Saint-Robert stream (coming from the east);
  west, to the bridge on Chemin du Rang Prescott;
  first south-west, curving south, then down north-west to its mouth.

The mouth of the Lemoine river corresponds to the confluence of the Benoit stream and is the source of the rivière Pot au Beurre.

Toponymy 
The term "Lemoine" turns out to be a family name of French origin.

The toponym "rivière Lemoine" was made official on January 21, 1975, in the place name bank of the Commission de toponymie du Québec.

See also 
 List of rivers of Quebec

References

Further reading

External links 

Rivers of Montérégie
Pierre-De Saurel Regional County Municipality
Les Maskoutains Regional County Municipality